Janne Hänninen (born 16 August 1975) is a Finnish former speedskater who specialised on the shorter distances 500 m, 1000 m, and 1500 m. 
His personal bests on these distances are 35.00 (1 December 2001), 1:08.45 (16 February 2002), and 1:46.04 (19 February 2002). He participated in three Olympics (1998, 2002, 2006) and a string of World Single Distance Championships and World Sprint Speed Skating Championships. Janne Hänninen is the son of former Finnish speedskater Seppo Hänninen, who also participated in three Olympics (1964, 1968, 1972).

Janne Hänninen's achievements spurred the creation of a new generation of top international class Finnish speedskating sprinters. These include Pekka Koskela, Pasi Koskela, Mika Poutala, Risto Rosendahl, and Vesa Rosendahl.

External links
 Janne Hänninen at SkateResults.com
 Photos of Janne Hänninen

1975 births
Living people
Finnish male speed skaters
Olympic speed skaters of Finland
Speed skaters at the 1998 Winter Olympics
Speed skaters at the 2002 Winter Olympics
Speed skaters at the 2006 Winter Olympics